The B 241 is a federal road (Bundesstraße) in Germany.

It runs from Hohenwepel (near Warburg) to Vienenburg.

Course

States and districts 
 North Rhine-Westphalia
 Höxter district
 Hohenwepel, Borgentreich, Dalhausen, Beverungen
 Lower Saxony
 Holzminden district
 Lauenförde
 Northeim district
 Amelith, Schönhagen, Kammerborn, Sohlingen, Uslar, Bollensen, Gierswalde, Volpriehausen, Goseplack, Hardegsen, Lutterhausen, Moringen, Höckelheim, Northeim, Hammenstedt, Katlenburg
 Göttingen district
 Dorste
 Osterode
 Goslar district
 Clausthal-Zellerfeld, Goslar, Vienenburg, Wiedelah

River crossings 
 Weser, between Beverungen and Lauenförde
 Ahle, in Uslar
 Leine, between Höckelheim und Northeim
 Gose near Goslar
 Rhume, in Northeim and in Katlenburg
 Söse, in Osterode
 Oker, in Oker and Vienenburg

Tourism 
 On the section between Lauenförde and Amelith there are two Grabungsstellen as well as the Hutewald Trail (Hutewaldpfad).
 The section between Uslar and Hardegsen was popular with motorcyclists because it ran over the winding and forested mountain road known as the Bollert which also had many straight sections before and after it, but now only parts remain as local roads. The Bollert section of the B241 has now been moved and widened to three lanes between Volpriehausen and Ellierode, improving road capacity and comfort, but making it less attractive to bikers. This work was completed in 2011.

See also 
 List of federal roads in Germany

References 

241
Transport in the Harz